The European Baseball Championship is the main championship tournament between national baseball teams in Europe, governed by the Confederation of European Baseball (CEB).

History
As of 2010, it is held every other year, in even-numbered years until 2019 and then in odd-numbered years, with a total of 34 European Baseball Championships having been played.

Qualification
The current European Baseball Championship classification system divides the national teams into three pools, those being A, B, and C. Teams in Pool A are automatically qualified for the next championship. The two best teams in Pool B will also qualify for the next championship. The two best teams in Pool C will promote to Pool B. The two weakest teams in Pool B will relegate to Pool C.

Current pools
As of end of 2022 tournaments.

Results (Pool A)

Medal table

Participating nations

See also
ESF Women's Championship
European Cup (baseball)
European Champion Cup Final Four

References

External links
official site

 
Baseball
International baseball competitions in Europe
Biennial sporting events
Recurring sporting events established in 1954
WBSC Europe competitions